Telegram is the first full-length and second overall remix album by Icelandic musician Björk, released on 25 November 1996. The album is a collection of remixes of several tracks from her album Post, which had all previously appeared as B-sides of the UK versions of the singles off Post, except the "Enjoy" remix which was previously unreleased. The cover was shot by Japanese photographer Nobuyoshi Araki. All of the songs on Post were remixed, excluding "The Modern Things" and "It's Oh So Quiet". The collection also included one new song entitled "My Spine" which was originally slated to appear on Post but was pushed out by "Enjoy", becoming the B-side to the UK "It's Oh So Quiet" single instead. The album has sold 228,000 copies in US according to SoundScan.

Content

The track listing was originally going to contain Talvin Singh's "Calcutta Cyber Cafe" mix of "Possibly Maybe" and Plaid's remix of "Big Time Sensuality". The Japanese version does not include the original version of "I Miss You".

The original UK LP pressing contains an alternate third track, the "Further Over the Edge Mix" of "Hyperballad" as opposed to the more commonly heard "Further Over the Edge Mix" of "Enjoy".  The remixes are nearly identical with the major difference being the chopped up vocals come from "Hyperballad" for the "Hyperballad" version and from "Enjoy" on the "Enjoy" version.  To date the "Hyperballad (Further Over the Edge Mix)" is exclusive to the original UK vinyl pressing while the original CD pressing and all subsequent CD and vinyl pressings contain the more common "Enjoy" version.

Björk also declared that the release of Telegram meant the end of an era consisting of Debut and Post.

Reception

The compilation was well received by music critics. Stephen Thomas Erlewine of AllMusic wrote, "Telegram works as an excellent introduction to techno for alternative pop fans unsure of where to begin exploring." According to CMJ New Music Monthly, musically the album contains "a real and surprising taste for recent trends in dance music". Douglas Wolk of CMJ New Music Monthly felt the music of Telegram was "actually better than Post", describing the tracks as "well-considered reworkings". The Rolling Stone Album Guide gave the album three and a half stars, and stated it "shed new light on the songs".

Track listing

Notes
The record mislabels the song as "Enjoy" (Further Over the Edge Mix)
 "Headphones" (Ø Remix) is also known as "Headphones" (Mika Vainio's 0Mix) or "Headphones" (The Mëtri Mix)

Charts

Release history

References

External links
 77ísland Discography entry for Telegram

Björk remix albums
Albums produced by Howie B
Albums produced by Nellee Hooper
1996 remix albums
One Little Independent Records remix albums
Albums produced by Björk
Techno remix albums
Post-rock albums by Icelandic artists
Electronic dance music albums by Icelandic artists